Sarcohyla mykter, also known as the keelsnout treefrog or keel-snouted treefrog, is a species of frog in the family Hylidae. It is endemic to the Sierra Madre del Sur in Guerrero, Mexico. Its sister species is Sarcohyla chryses.

Sarcohyla mykter occurs in high-elevation ( above sea level) cloud and wet pine-oak forest and oak woodland in association with streams, its breeding habitat. It is an uncommon species, even though it is regularly encountered during surveys. It is threatened by habitat loss and potentially also by chytridiomycosis. It is not known from protected areas.

References

mykter
Endemic amphibians of Mexico
Fauna of the Sierra Madre del Sur
Amphibians described in 1972
Taxonomy articles created by Polbot